Japan participated in the 2010 Asian Games in Guangzhou, China on 12–27 November 2010.

Sailing

Men

Women

Open

Sepaktakraw

Men's double regu
Team
Yuichi MatsudaSusumu TeramotoTakeshi Terashima

Preliminary

Group B

Semifinal

Men's team
Team
Susumu TeramotoYuichi MatsudaTakeshi TerashimaYoshitaka IidaTomoyuki NakatsukaJun MotohashiMasahiro YamadaSeiya TakanoMasanori Hayashi

Preliminary

Group B

Semifinal

Women's double regu
Team
Sawa AokiYukie SatoChiharu Yano

Preliminary

Group B

Semifinal

Women's team
Team
Sawa AokiYukie SatoChiharu YanoSatomi IshiharaYumi IshinoAika KameokaAzusa KawaiAzusa MasukoYuka Watanabe
Preliminary

Group A

Shooting

Men

Women

Soft Tennis

Softball

Women
Team
Yukiyo MineRei NishiyamaAyumi KarinoHaruna SakamotoShizuyo HamamotoMisato KawanoEmi MatsuokaEri YamadaSayuri YamaneMika SomeyaNaoko MatsumotoYukiko UenoMakiko FujiwaraSatoko MabuchiMaki Tanigawa

Preliminaries

Semifinals

Grand final

Squash

Swimming

Men

* Participated in the heats only.

Women

Synchronized swimming

Table Tennis

Taekwondo

Men

Women

Tennis

Triathlon

Volleyball

Men

Team
Akio NagaeTakeshi NaganoNaoya SugaDaisuke UsamiYoshifumi SuzukiYuya AgebaTakaaki TomimatsuKota YamamuraKunihiro ShimizuTatsuya FukuzawaYusuke IshijimaYuta Yoneyama

Preliminary

Group D

|}

|}
Second round

Group F

|}

|}
Quarterfinals

|}
Semifinals

|}
Gold medal match

|}

Women

Team
Hiroko HakutaMiku IzuokaMisato KimuraMayumi KosugeSaki MinemuraMariko MoriYuki NishiyamaRika NomotoSakura NumataShoko OmuraMasami YokoyamaMinami Yoshida

Preliminary

Group B

|}

|}
Quarterfinals

|}
Placement 5–8

|}
Placement 5th–6th

|}

Water polo

Men

Team
Katsuyuki TanamuraMitsuaki ShigaKan IreiKoji TakeiKan AoyagiHiroki WakamatsuYusuke ShimizuAkira YanaseKoji KobayashiYoshinori ShiotaAtsushi NaganumaSatoshi NagataShota Hazui

Preliminary

Group A

Quarterfinals

Semifinals

Bronze medal match

Weightlifting

Wrestling

Men
Freestyle

Greco-Roman
{| class="wikitable" border="1" style="font-size:90%"
|-
!rowspan=2|Athlete
!rowspan=2|Event
!Round of 16
!Quarterfinals
!Semifinals
!Final
|-
!OppositionResult
!OppositionResult
!OppositionResult
!OppositionResult
|-
|Kohei Hasegawa
|55 kg
|align=center|W PO 3-0
|align=center|W ST 4-0
|align=center|W PP 3-1
|align=center|W VT 5-0
|-
|Ryutaro Matsumoto
|60 kg
|align=center|L PO 0-3
|align=center|Did not advance
|align=center|Repechage Round 1 match:W PP 3-1
|align=center|Bronze medal match:W PP 3-1
|-
|Tsutomu Fujimura
|66 kg
|align=center|W PO 3-0
|align=center|W PP 3-1
|align=center|L PO 0-3
|align=center|Bronze medal match:W PP 3-1
|-
|Tsukasa Tsurumaki
|74 kg
|align=center|W PP 3-1
|align=center|W PO 3-0
|align=center|W PP 3-1
|align=center|L PO 0-3
|-
|Norikatsu Saikawa
|84 kg
|align=center|L PO 0-3
|align=center colspan="7"|Did not advance
|-
|Katsuya Kitamura
|96 kg
|align=center|W PP 3-1
|align=center|L PO 0-3''
|align=center colspan="7"|Did not advance
|-
|Hirokazu Shinjo
|120 kg
|align=center|L PP 1-3|align=center colspan="7"|Did not advance
|}

Women
Freestyle

Wushu

MenChangquanNanquan\NangunTaijiquan\TaijijianWomenChangquanTaijiquan\TaijijianJianshu\Qiangshu'''

References

Nations at the 2010 Asian Games
2010
Asian Games